Françoise Guégot (born 11 August 1962) was a member of the National Assembly of France.  She represented Seine-Maritime's 2nd constituency,  as a member of the Union for a Popular Movement from 2007 to 2017.

References

1962 births
Living people
People from Oullins
The Republicans (France) politicians
Union for a Popular Movement politicians
The Social Right
Mayors of places in Normandy
Women members of the National Assembly (France)
Women mayors of places in France
Deputies of the 13th National Assembly of the French Fifth Republic
Deputies of the 14th National Assembly of the French Fifth Republic
21st-century French women politicians
Paris Dauphine University alumni
Politicians from Auvergne-Rhône-Alpes
Members of the Regional Council of Normandy